Vagn Kastrup (18 May 1905 – 8 July 1976) was a Danish sailor. He competed in the 8 Metre event at the 1936 Summer Olympics.

References

External links
 

1905 births
1976 deaths
Danish male sailors (sport)
Olympic sailors of Denmark
Sailors at the 1936 Summer Olympics – 8 Metre
People from Randers
Sportspeople from the Central Denmark Region